Lake Creek Township is an inactive township in Pettis County, in the U.S. state of Missouri.

Lake Creek Township was erected in 1872, taking its name from Lake Creek.

References

Townships in Missouri
Townships in Pettis County, Missouri